The Tabali River is a river located in Morobe Province, Papua New Guinea. The river flows into the Huon Gulf at Nassau Bay, west of Cape Dinga.

Rivers of Papua New Guinea
Morobe Province